Payam Sanat Amol F.C. (Kachila) is an Iranian football club based in Amol, Iran. They currently compete in the 2013–14 Iran Football's 2nd Division.

History
Payam Sanat won the 3rd Division in 2013 and was promoted to the 2013–2014 2nd Division season.

Season-by-Season
The table below shows the achievements of the club in various competitions.

Club managers
  Hossein Vali Nejad (2011–2013)
  Rahman Rezaei (2013–2013)
  Behrouz Valipour (2013–2013)
  Jamshid Ghadiri (2013–)

Achievements
Winner (1) 2012–13 Iran Football's 3rd Division

See also
 Football in Iran
  Official Web Site

Football clubs in Iran
Association football clubs established in 2011